Katete is a village in Zambia.

Katete may also refer to:

 Katete (Uganda)

Zambia
 Katete District
 Katete North
 Katete South